Palmetto (meaning "little palm") may refer to:

Palms
Several small palms in the Arecaceae (palm tree) family:
in the genus Sabal:
Bermuda palmetto, Sabal bermudana
Birmingham palmetto, Sabal 'Birmingham' 
Cabbage palmetto, Sabal palmetto
Dwarf, or bush palmetto, Sabal minor
Hispaniola palmetto, Sabal domingensis
Jamaica palmetto, Sabal maritima
Mexican, Texas, or Rio Grande palmetto, Sabal mexicana
Miami palmetto, Sabal miamiensis
Puerto Rico palmetto, Sabal causiarum
Rosei palmetto, Sabal rosei
Royal palmetto, Sabal pumos
Scrub palmetto, Sabal etonia
Sonoran palmetto, Sabal uresana
Yucatán palmetto, Sabal gretheriae
Palmetto, Chamaerops humilis, native to Europe and north Africa
Saw palmetto, Serenoa repens, native to North America

Places
 Palmetto, Alabama
 Palmetto, California
 Palmetto, Florida
 Palmetto Bay, Florida 
 Palmetto Beach, neighborhood in Tampa, Florida
 Palmetto Estates, Florida
 Palmetto Historic District
 Palmetto, Georgia
 Palmetto, Oglethorpe County, Georgia
 Palmetto, Louisiana
 Palmetto, Missouri
 Palmetto, Nevada, a ghost town

Schools
 Miami Palmetto High School in Pinecrest, Florida
 Palmetto Bay Academy in Miami, Florida
 Palmetto High School (Florida) in Palmetto, Florida
 Palmetto High School (South Carolina) in Williamston, South Carolina
 Palmetto Ridge High School in Naples, Florida
 Palmetto State e-Cademy, a virtual public charter school in South Carolina

Transportation
 Palmetto (train), an Amtrak passenger train in the United States
 Palmetto (ACL train), a former ACL passenger train in the United States
 Palmetto (Metrorail station) in Miami, Florida
 Palmetto Railroad, former railroad in North Carolina and South Carolina
 Palmetto Railway, former railroad in North Carolina and South Carolina
 Palmetto Trail, foot and bike trail in South Carolina
 The Palmetto Expressway, Florida State Road 826

Entertainment
 Palmetto (film), a 1998 neo-noir
 Palmetto Records, an American jazz record label founded in 1990
 Palmetto State Quartet, a gospel group from Greenville, South Carolina
 "The Palmetto State Song", a 1860 song popular during the American Civil War
 Palmetto Pointe, a 2005 TV show
 Palmetto Leaves, an 1873 memoir by Harriet Beecher Stowe

Other
 Palmetto State, the official nickname for the state of South Carolina
 Palmetto (crater), of the moon
 Palmetto Cheese, brand of pimento cheese
 Palmetto Electric
 Palmetto FC Bantams, amateur soccer team in Greenwood, South Carolina
 Order of the Palmetto, the highest civilian honor awarded by the governor of South Carolina
 Palmetto Regiment, military unit of volunteers from South Carolina serving in the Mexican–American War
 CSS Palmetto State, an 1862 Confederate ironclad ship
 Palmetto Island State Park, Louisiana
 Palmetto State Park, Gonzales County, Texas
 Palmetto Mountains, range in Nevada
 Palmetto Health Baptist Columbia, South Carolina
 Palmetto Health Richland, hospital network in Columbia, South Carolina
 Palmetto Health, hospital network in Richland County, South Carolina
 Florida woods cockroach, a.k.a. Palmetto bug, different species from American cockroach
 Palmetto Skipper, Euphyes arpa, a butterfly
 Palmetto Pass, an electronic toll collection system in South Carolina

See also
 Palmetto Bay (disambiguation)
 Palmetto Middle School (disambiguation)
 Palmetto High School (disambiguation)